The 2022 Miami RedHawks football team represented Miami University as a member of the East Division of the Mid-American Conference (MAC) during the 2022 NCAA Division I FBS football season. They were led by ninth-year head coach Chuck Martin and played their home games at Yager Stadium in Oxford, Ohio.

Previous season

The RedHawks finished the 2021 season 7–6, 5–3 in MAC play to finish second in the East Division. They received an invitation to the Frisco Football Classic where they defeated North Texas 27–14.

Preseason

MAC media day
The Mid-American Conference media day was held on July 26, 2022 at House of Blues in Cleveland, Ohio. The RedHawks were predicted to finish in first place in the East Division in the Mid-American preseason poll.

Roster

Schedule

Games summaries

at Kentucky

Robert Morris

Cincinnati

at Northwestern

at Buffalo

Kent State

at Bowling Green

Western Michigan

at Akron

Ohio

at Northern Illinois

Ball State

UAB (Bahamas Bowl)

References

Miami
Miami RedHawks football seasons
Miami RedHawks football